Non Sila may refer to

Non Sila District, Khon Kaen province, Thailand
Non Sila Subdistrict, Non Sila district, Khon Kaen province, Thailand
Non Sila Subdistrict Municipality, Non Sila district, Khon Kaen province, Thailand
Non Sila Subdistrict, Pak Khat district, Bueng Kan province, Thailand
Non Sila Subdistrict, Sahatsakhan district, Kalasin province, Thailand